David Sayer can refer to:

 David Sayer (Kent cricketer) (1936–2017), English cricketer
 David Sayer (Leicestershire cricketer) (born 1997), English cricketer